Norsk Lovtidend (Norwegian Law Gazette) is a Norwegian periodical published by the Ministry of Justice and the Police. The magazine was first published in 1877. It is regulated by a law from 1969, which replaced an earlier law from 1876. From 2001 official publication of new laws or revisions are made on Lovdatas website, while a printed version continued to be published until 2016.

References

External links

1877 establishments in Norway
2016 disestablishments in Norway
Defunct magazines published in Norway
Legal magazines
Magazines established in 1877
Magazines disestablished in 2016
Magazines published in Oslo
Norwegian-language magazines
Online magazines with defunct print editions